Helgi Hrafn Gunnarsson (born 22 October 1980) is an Icelandic former member of parliament representing Reykjavik Constituency North. He is a member of the Icelandic Pirate Party. First elected in 2013, he did not contest the 2021 election.

References

Living people
Helgi Hrafn Gunnarsson
Helgi Hrafn Gunnarsson
Helgi Hrafn Gunnarsson
Helgi Hrafn Gunnarsson
1980 births